The New Birth is the debut album by the American R&B and funk band New Birth. It was released on November 1, 1970 in North America by RCA and produced by mentor Harvey Fuqua, whose style of building a whole song around a simple phrase is represented by "The Unh Song", and his uncredited assistant Vernon Bullock.

Album background
The New Birth was as much a concept as it was a group, as it consisted of the instrumental group The Nite-Liters, (already famous for the song "K-Jee"), who during their height, consisted of James Baker, Robin Russell, Leroy Taylor, Charlie Hearndon, Tony Churchill, Austin Lander, Robert "Lurch" Jackson, (and, at this point, Johnny Graham, though they would later add Carl McDaniel), female vocalists, The Mint Juleps (which featured Londee Loren (Wiggins), Tanita Gaines, Janice Carter and Pam Swent), male vocalists, The New Sounds (Bobby Downs, Ronald Coleman, Gary Martin Young and George "Slim" House) plus additional vocalist Allen Frye, who also doubled on percussion.

Track listing

References

External links
 New Birth-The New Birth at Discogs

1970 debut albums
New Birth (band) albums
RCA Records albums
Albums produced by Harvey Fuqua